TWAIN and TWAIN Direct are application programming interfaces (APIs) and communication protocols that regulate communication between software and digital imaging devices, such as image scanners and digital cameras. TWAIN is supported on Microsoft Windows, Linux and Mac OS X.

The three key elements of TWAIN are:
 Application software. For example, graphics software, a fax application or a word processor.
 Source manager software. The source manager software is a software library provided by the TWAIN Working Group.
 Device drivers (referred to as "Source software" in the specification document) 

Both the application and the device driver must support TWAIN for the interface to be successfully used.

The first release was in 1992,
and it was last updated in 2021.

It was designed with the help of a number of companies from the computer industry, to try to establish a unified standard connection interface between computers and imaging devices.

History 

The design of TWAIN began in January 1991. The TWAIN group was originally launched in 1992 by several members of the imaging industry, with the intention of standardizing communication between image handling software and hardware. Review of the original TWAIN Developer's Toolkit occurred from April, 1991 through January, 1992.

On September 19, 2019, the TWAIN Working Group announced TWAIN Direct 1.0 which is a RESTful API version of the TWAIN specification.

Name origin
The word TWAIN is not officially an acronym, but it is a backronym. The official website notes that "the word TWAIN is from Kipling's "The Ballad of East and West" — '...and never the twain shall meet...' — reflecting the difficulty, at the time, of connecting scanners and personal computers. 

It was up-cased to TWAIN to make it more distinctive. This led people to believe it was an acronym, and then to a contest to come up with an expansion. None was selected, but the entry Technology Without an Interesting Name continues to haunt the standard. For example, the Encyclopedia of Information Technology lists "Technology Without an Interesting Name" as the official meaning of TWAIN.

Objectives 

Objectives of the TWAIN Working Group and standard include:

  Ensure image-handling software and hardware compatibility
  Keep the specification current with the state of current software and hardware while maintaining backward compatibility
  Provide multiple-platform support
  Maintain and distribute a no-charge developer's toolkit
  Ensure ease of implementation
  Encourage widespread adoption
  Open Source Data Source Manager
  LGPL Open Source License
  BSD Open Source Sample Application and Sample Data Source Application

TWAIN provides support for:

  Production, high-speed scanning
  ICC Color profiles
  Digital cameras
  Multiple operating system platforms including Windows, classic Mac OS, macOS, and Linux

TWAIN Working Group 

Today the TWAIN standard, including the specification, data source manager and sample code, are maintained by the not-for-profit organization TWAIN Working Group.

Board and associate members of the TWAIN Working Group include:

 Atalasoft, a Kofax Company
 Dynamsoft
 Epson
 ExactCODE GmbH
 Fujitsu
 Hewlett-Packard
 ICE Health Systems
 InoTec GmbH
 Kodak Alaris
 Microtek International, Inc.
 P3iD Technologies Inc.
 PDF Association
 Plustek
 Visioneer, Inc.

See also 

 Windows Image Acquisition
 Scanner Access Now Easy (SANE)
 Image and Scanner Interface Specification (ISIS)

References

External links 
 TWAIN Working Group
 TWAIN Direct project

Application programming interfaces
Computing input devices
Image scanning